Pappu Yadav (born 25 February 1974) is an Indian wrestler. He competed at the 1992 Summer Olympics and the 1996 Summer Olympics. He also won a gold medal at the 1993 Asian Wrestling Championships.

References

1974 births
Living people
Indian male sport wrestlers
Olympic wrestlers of India
Wrestlers at the 1992 Summer Olympics
Wrestlers at the 1996 Summer Olympics
Place of birth missing (living people)
Wrestlers at the 1994 Asian Games
Asian Games competitors for India
Recipients of the Arjuna Award
Asian Wrestling Championships medalists
20th-century Indian people